Icahn may refer to:

 Icahn School of Medicine at Mount Sinai
 Icahn Stadium
 Icahn Enterprises
 Carl Icahn (born 1936), American entrepreneur
 Brett Icahn (born 1979), American businessman, son of Carl Icahn